Cottage Row Historic District is a national historic district located in Saranac Lake (Harrietstown) in Franklin County, New York.  It includes 27 contributing privately owned single-family dwellings built between 1900 and 1940, with the majority constructed between 1907 and 1917.  They are mostly two- or three-story, wood-framed structures, with gable or gambrel roofs, dormers, and wood siding or shingles.  Most of the residences were operated as commercial, private tuberculosis sanitorium, with characteristic architectural features of the "cure cottage," including second story sleeping porches, extra wide doorways, and call bell systems.

It was listed on the National Register of Historic Places in 1992.

References

External links
Historic Saranac Lake: Cottage Row Historic District

Historic districts on the National Register of Historic Places in New York (state)
Houses on the National Register of Historic Places in New York (state)
Shingle Style architecture in New York (state)
Colonial Revival architecture in New York (state)
Historic districts in Franklin County, New York
Houses in Franklin County, New York
National Register of Historic Places in Franklin County, New York